Cherry Bikini is a Los Angeles, California based electropop/electroclash duo made up of Sophie Boscallini (vocals) and Armand Abagliani (synths, guitars, programming).

Biography

The band started in 2002 in Paris, France, where they recorded their first album, Cherry Bikini (2002). In the next several years, Cherry Bikini achieved underground notoriety due to their hyper-explicit lyrics on songs such as "Just Fuck Me", "Fingers (Inside Me)", and "A Good Hard Lay".

After relocating to Los Angeles in 2003, they recorded and released their second full-length CD, Dream Days (2004). Towards the end of that year they released Remixed (2004), a collection of remixes of some of their better known songs by underground DJs and producers. 2007 saw the release of a subsequent full-length album, entitled "13", and in 2012 the duo released an EP called "Sequences". In May 2015, Cherry Bikini released two albums, - "Bedroom Stars", a compilation album of their early material, and an EP called "This Thing We Got".

The signature Cherry Bikini sound is characterized by Sophie Boscallini's "somewhat detached".  take on lust, set over strong electropop hooks and dance beats. Their songs often "deal with sexuality with a matter-of-fact explicitness". All of their CDs to date have been self-produced and independently released.

Solo activities of the members 
Sophie Boscallini has a long history of working as an actress and model in Europe and the United States. Armand Abagliani has been involved in numerous side projects. He has co-produced several albums.

Discography

Albums
Cherry Bikini (2002)
Dream Days (2004)
Remixed (2004)
13 (2007)
Sequences (2012)
Bedroom Stars (2015)
This Thing We Got (2015)

Compilations
Bad Gurrlz (Gay Records) (2003)

References

External links 
 
 

Electronic music groups from California
Musical groups established in 2002
2002 establishments in California